Song Jia (宋佳, born on May 11, 1962) is a Chinese actress. She is today also known colloquially as Da Song Jia (大宋佳, literally: "Song Jia the older", to distinguish her from another younger actress also called Song Jia) to distinguish from the younger actress of the same name. As a young actress she herself appeared on the cover of Dazhong Dianying in June 1990. She played Lady Zhao in the 2001 TV series Qin Shi Huang. She will play Cao Hui (曹慧) in CCTV's Deng Xiaoping biopic 2014 .

Filmography
 Ming Dynasty (2007)
 Kung Fu Angels (2014)

Awards
Best Actress for Spacious Courtyard (:zh:庭院深深)
Best Actress for Amid the Howling Wind (:zh:落山風)

References

1962 births
Living people
20th-century Chinese actresses
21st-century Chinese actresses
Chinese television actresses
Chinese film actresses